Bråvalla Wing, also F 13 Norrköping, or simply F 13, is a former Swedish Air Force wing with the main base located near Norrköping in south-eastern Sweden.

History
The Air Wing was established in 1943 as the fourth fighter wing, and the thirteenth wing in total, in the Swedish Air Force.

The location had been mapped out in 1941 and consisted of purchased land from Sörby, Knivberga and Ringstad farmsteads. In 1942, preparation work on the almost square 1000 m by 1000 m grass air field was started and completed in September 1943. The main administration was housed inside Norrköping main hotel until the first office buildings were completed in 1945. The wing was given the name Bråvalla as a tie to the  Battle of Bråvalla in 770.

The first fighter squadrons were set up by the Italian built J 11 in 1943 which was quickly replaced by the Swedish built J 22 in 1944.

In 1946, F 13 became the first wing in the Swedish Air Force to convert to jets with the J 28. It was later also first wing to introduce J 29 and J 35 in service in 1951 and 1960 respectively.

In 1976 a new reconnaissance squadron was set up with a combined SF/SH 37 fleet and in 1980, F 13 was yet again the first wing to receive the JA 37.

On June 3, 1992 the decision was made to decommission the squadrons on June 30, 1993 and the remaining wing administration on June 30, 1994.

F 13 today
The airfield is today known as Norrköping-Bråvalla airfield (ICAO: ESCK). It is currently administered by Blekinge Wing (F 17) and is mainly used as a storage facility for obsolete equipment. The underground facility called Berget (The mountain) is still being maintained and could hold a number of fighters. One of the runways is still operational and can be reactivated.

Heraldry and traditions

Coat of arms
"Or, the town badge of Norrköping, sitting on a throne gules, a Saint Olof image dressed azure, crown or and halo, axe and orb azure."

Colours, standards and guidons

Wing colour
The first colour was presented to the wing at Svea Air Corps (F 8) at Barkarby Airport by His Majesty the King Gustaf V on 17 September 1944. Blazon: "On blue cloth in the centre the badge of the Air Force; a winged two-bladed propeller under a royal crown proper, all in yellow. In the first corner a saint seated on a bench with a crown on his head, an ax in his right hand and an orb in his left, all or, halo and axe argent." Decor through inserting and embroidery.

Traditional colours
The wing had the colour of Östgöta Wing (F 3) from 1974 to 1994 and the colours of Södermanland Wing (F 11) from 1980 to 1994 as traditional colours.

March
”Bråvalla flygflottiljs marsch” composed around 1920s by Sam Rydberg under the name "Formering till tåg" and dedicated to Crown Prince Gustaf Adolf in 1926. The march, which was also given the title "Nordiska spelen", was used as a regimental march of the Life Grenadier Regiment from 1929 to 1933 and then as a defiliation march. It was adopted and established as march for Bråvalla Wing on 4 April 1986.

Commanding officers
From 1943 to 1977, the commanding officers was referred to as flottiljchef ("wing commander") and had the rank of lieutenant colonel. From 1951, the wing commander at F 13 received the rank of colonel. From 1977 to 1981, the wing commander was referred to as sektorflottiljchef ("sector wing commander") and had the rank of senior colonel. From 1981 to 1994, the commanding officer was again referred to as flottiljchef ("wing commander"), and had from 1991 the rank of colonel.

Wing and sector wing commanders

1943–1947: Lage Thunberg
1947–1948: Grels Naeslund
1948–1950: Ante Söderlindh
1950–1959: Frank Cervell
1959–1964: Nils-Magnus von Arbin
1964–1966: Hans Neij
1966–1966: Gunnar Rissler
1966–1979: Carl Norberg
1980–1984: Kurt Hagerström
1984–1987: Börje Björkholm
1987–1991: Hermann Schulz
1991–1994: Göte Pudas

Deputy sector wing commanders
In order to relieve the sector wing commander, a deputy sector wing commander position was added in 1977. Its task was to lead the unit procurement, a task largely similar to the old wing commander position. Hence he was also referred to as flottiljchef ("wing commander"). The deputy sector wing commander had the rank of colonel. On 30 June 1981, the deputy sector wing commander position was terminated.

1977–1979: Bengt Lönnbom
1979–1981: Stig Abrahamsson

Names, designations and locations

See also 
 Swedish Air Force
 List of military aircraft of Sweden

References

Notes

Print

Web

Further reading

Wings of the Swedish Air Force
Military units and formations established in 1943
Military units and formations disestablished in 1994
1943 establishments in Sweden
1994 disestablishments in Sweden
Disbanded units and formations of Sweden